Bell Telephone Building or variations such as Southwestern Bell Telephone Building and Old Bell Telephone Building, may refer to:

in Canada
Bell Telephone Building (Montreal)

in the United States

Old Bell Telephone Building (Osceola, Arkansas), listed on the National Register of Historic Places (NRHP)
Southern Bell Telephone Company Building, Atlanta, Georgia, listed on the NRHP
AT&T Midtown Center, Atlanta, Georgia, formerly known as Southern Bell Center
Rocky Mountain Bell Telephone Company Building (Idaho Falls, Idaho), listed on the NRHP in Bonneville County, Idaho
Oak Tower, Kansas City, Missouri, also known as Bell Telephone Building
Bell Telephone Building (St. Louis, Missouri), listed on the NRHP
Bell Telephone Laboratories (Manhattan), New York, New York, listed on the NRHP
Southwestern Bell Telephone Building (Stroud, Oklahoma), listed on the NRHP in Lincoln County, Oklahoma
Bell Telephone Company Building (Philadelphia, Pennsylvania), listed on the NRHP
Bell Telephone Exchange Building (Powelton Village, Philadelphia, Pennsylvania), listed on the NRHP
 Bell Telephone Building (Pittsburgh, Pennsylvania), a relatively tall building

See also
List of telephone company buildings
 Bell Telephone (disambiguation)
 Telephone Company Building (disambiguation)
Bell Building (disambiguation)